Ashurst is a multinational law firm headquartered in London. It has 27 offices in 15 countries apart from the United Kingdom, across Asia, Australia, Europe, the Middle East and North America, and employs around 1,600 legal advisers. Ashurst is 63rd in the list of 100 largest law firms in the world by revenue, and 7th in the list of largest UK law firms by revenue.

Its principal business focus is mergers and acquisitions, corporate and structured finance. The firm also has practices in other areas including investment funds, antitrust, energy, transport and infrastructure, intellectual property, IT, dispute resolution, financial services, tax, real estate, regulatory, telecommunication and employment..

History

Ashurst Morris Crisp 

The firm was founded in 1822, at 6 Old Jewry in the City of London, under the name Ashurst Morris Crisp. The three initial founders were William H. Ashurst, John Morris, and Sir Frank Crisp.

Growth and Financial Crisis 
After rebranding as Ashurst LLP in 2003, the firm was faced with profits lagging its peer group and the risk of a contracting work force. One abortive initiative in 2004 that allowed the management to pay high performers additional bonuses was seen as symbolic of the defensiveness of the time. However, the team of veteran senior partner Geoffrey Green and managing partner Simon Bromwich were to begin having more success in managing the firm. Partly this involved a more actively managed partnership and a handful of discreetly handled exits. The firm was also able to make more progress in building up its core M&A practice, in particular improving its investment banking links, and dealing with quality problems in its foreign network. The firm was also aided by a continued strong performance from its finance practice. With partner profits rocketing in 2007 to take top earners past the £1m mark, placing the firm comfortably in the UK top 10 in profitability.

In 2008, the firm voted in corporate partner Charlie Geffen to succeed Green as senior partner after an election against veteran litigator Ed Sparrow. The credit turmoil that gripped financial markets in the summer of 2007, which became a full-blown banking crisis and recession the following year, had a substantial impact on Ashurst's core practice lines. Profits fell and revenue suffered a dip. But the firm quickly steered itself out of trouble, and figures began to rise again.

Combination with Blake Dawson 

Ashurst announced strong 2011 results, with profit per partner rising 5% to £723,000 and total revenue growing 3.5% to £303 million. As of the summer of 2011, Ashurst had over 900 lawyers, including over 200 partners, in 12 countries.

On 1 March 2012, Ashurst merged its Asian business with that of Australian law firm Blake Dawson, a member of the Big Six, Blake Dawson being renamed as Ashurst across all offices.

Blake Dawson had its origins in Melbourne in 1841 when James Hunter Ross emigrated from Scotland and set up practice in a tent on the corner of Bourke and William Streets in Melbourne. In 1874, he adopted the name of Blake & Riggall, which remained unchanged for 114 years. In 1881, George Charles King Waldron commenced practice in Pitt Street in Sydney under the name of Dawson Waldron.
 
From the early years, these two firms played a significant part in the legal system in Victoria and New South Wales, with a substantial commercial, litigation and property practice. The firm's client base included large corporations, banks, mining and pastoral companies.

Blake Dawson Waldron was formed in 1988 through a merger of Blake & Riggall (Melbourne, Brisbane), Dawson Waldron (Sydney, Canberra and Singapore), Collison Hunt & Richardson (Perth) and McCubbery Train Love and Thomas (Port Moresby). This merger brought together lawyers from all of the major commercial centres in Australia as well as important centres in the Asia and Pacific regions. Three further Asian offices were established, in Jakarta in 1988, Shanghai in 1995 and Singapore in 2009. 
 
As a result of the combination, Ashurst now has 1,600 lawyers and 2,820 staff working across 24 offices, with worldwide revenue exceeding £550 million. Ashurst has also gained new offices in Adelaide, Brisbane, Canberra, Jakarta, Melbourne, Perth, Port Moresby, Shanghai and Sydney. This significantly increases Ashurst's resources and its stronghold in the energy & resources, infrastructure and financial services sectors.

References

External links 
Ashurst website
 Profiles in the Chambers Student Guide, and on RollOnFriday and the Cambridge University Law Society website.
Ashurst – Blake Dawson Merger

Law firms based in London
Law firms established in 1822
1822 establishments in England
Foreign law firms with offices in Japan
British companies established in 1822
Foreign law firms with offices in Hong Kong